Jeonju is the 16th largest city in South Korea and the capital of North Jeolla Province. It is both urban and rural due to the closeness of Wanju County which almost entirely surrounds Jeonju (Wanju County has many residents who work in Jeonju). The name Jeonju literally means "Perfect Region" (from the hanja  (jeon) for perfect,  (ju) for region). It is an important tourist center famous for Korean food, historic buildings, sports activities, and innovative festivals.

In May 2012, Jeonju was chosen as a Creative City for Gastronomy as part of UNESCO's Creative Cities Network. This honour recognizes the city's traditional home cooking handed down over thousands of years, its active public and private food research, a system of nurturing talented chefs, and its hosting of distinctive food festivals.

History 
The Baekje kingdom was located in southwestern Korea which included the area Jeonju is now located. It is believed that Jeonju was founded as a market town within Baekje around 57 BCE.

Jeonju (along with Baekje in general) was conquered by the kingdom of Silla in 660 CE. It soon became part of the Silla kingdom and in 685, Jeonju became one of the nine chu (a provincial capital of the kingdom). From 889 and onward, peasant revolts (caused from over taxation) became widespread throughout the kingdom and it also spread to Jeonju where it became the headquarters of one of the most powerful rebel leaders of the time, Gyeon Hwon. In 892 (or 900), Gyeon Hwon renamed the city Wansan and established it as the capital of the Later Baekje kingdom. From Wansan, Gyeon Hwon campaigned against Silla which climaxed with the destruction of Geumseong (the capital of the Silla kingdom) and the assassination of King Gyeongae in 927. With the decline of Silla, Gyeon Hwon and Wang Geon (of the Goryeo kingdom) waged battle for control of the peninsula. However, Wang Geon and his forces invaded Later Baekje in 934 and Jeonju surrendered to him in 935.

Under Goryeo rule, Jeonju reverted to being a provincial capital and enjoyed relative stability and economic growth. However, in 1182, the city was taken by peasant rebels with the aid of governmental troops stationed there who resented being forced to do heavy labor along slaves. The rebellion was soon suppressed forty days after it began.

The Joseon defeated Goryeo and founded a new dynasty in 1392 and took all their possessions including Jeonju. The Joseon considered Jeonju their ancestral home (an ancestor of Yi Seonggye of Joseon may have fled Jeonju after the 1182 peasant revolt). During the Joseon period, Jeonju became the capital of a reorganized Jeolla (one of the eight provinces of the Joseon). In 1413, Jeonju (along with three other cities) was given the honor of safekeeping copies of the Annals of the Joseon Dynasty which still survives extant in the former Confucian academy in Jeonju.

The town was occupied by the Donghak Peasant Revolution in 1894. Jeonju (like the rest of Korea) was then occupied by the Japanese beginning in 1910. The ancient walls of the old city were destroyed by the Japanese authorities with the Pungnammum Gate being the only remnant left today. Jeonju's population grew between 1925 and 1949 when it reached 100,000 inhabitants. Jeonju was given metropolitan status in 1935, and the city was founded in 1949. During the Division of Korea, Jeonju was not in the immediate frontline of the war but by the armistice signing in July 1953, Jeonju (along with many other cities) suffered bombardment and the loss of many male residents who fought during the war.

Jeonju was given its modern boundaries and government system in 1963. It has since then industrialized rapidly. Since the Joseon Dynasty period, it was a metropolis, but it did not experience industrialization in the 20th century compared to other parts of Korea. It does not have the industrial infrastructure, manufacturing, or heavy industries found in other major Korean cities. Today, traditional tourism and sightseeing is a major industry in the city.

Culture 
Jeonju bibimbap 전주비빔밥, a traditional local food, is well known across South Korea. There are several very popular vegetarian restaurants serving Jeonju style food and pine wine.
The National Jeonju Museum exhibits ancient relics from the Baekje days.
There are extensive royal museums, temples, a castle fortress on a hillside, and a well-known paper museum, as well as an annual paper fashion show highlighting the latest styles and traditional Korean clothing made of paper.
The Jeonju Hanok Village (Hanok Maeul) is a traditional-style village in the heart of Jeonju, housing over 800 traditional "hanok" style buildings. It contains many traditional tea shops, souvenir shops, and restaurants.
Jeongdong Catholic Church was built on 1908–1914 by French priest Xavier Baudonet on the site of the Korean Catholic martyrs in 1791 and 1801. This Byzantine and Romanesque church has been designated Korea National Treasure No. 288.
The Jeonju International Sori Festival was among Songlines' 25 Best International Festivals in 2014. 
The Jeonju International Film Festival draws about 50,000 visitors annually.
Jeonju is the hometown of the breakdancing crew Last for One, international Battle of the Year champions.
Gyeonggijeon is a place to  enshirine the portrait of Lee Sunggye called the first king of the Chosun dynasty.
The local mountains and parks are popular for outdoor recreation due to its rural location. There are historical sites in the area. The city has a zoo, a park, and the Hanguk Sound and Culture Hall, a large, modern concert complex on the Jeonbuk National University campus.

Notable people
 Defconn (born Yoo Dae-joon 1976), rapper and TV personality
 Lee Min-woo (born 1979), singer  and member of Shinhwa
 Lee Chang-ho (born 1975), professional Go player 
 Kim Kyu-jong (born 1987), singer and member of SS501
 Yoon Kyun-sang (born 1987), actor
 Taeyeon (born Kim Tae-yeon 1989), singer and member of Girls' Generation
 Kim Sung-kyu (born 1989), singer and member of Infinite
 E-Tion (born Lee Chang-yoon 1994), singer, dancer and member of ONF
 Hwasa (born Ahn Hye-jin 1995), singer and member of Mamamoo
 Wheein (born Jung Whee-in 1995), singer and member of Mamamoo
 Choi Yujin (born 1996), singer and member of CLC and Kep1er
 Baekgyeol (born Jung Se-min 1997), singer and member of GreatGuys
 Choi Byung-chan (born 1997), singer and member of Victon
 Yang Hong-seok, (born 1997), basketball player for Suwon KT Sonicboom and the South Korean national team
 New (born Choi Chan-hee 1998), singer and member of The Boyz
 Na Jae-min (born 2000), singer and member of NCT
 Kim Hyun-jin (born 2000), singer and member of LOONA
 Hwang Ye-ji (born 2000), singer and member of Itzy (Originally from Seoul)
 Choi Yeon-jun (born 1999), singer and member of Tomorrow X Together (Originally from Seoul)
So Yi-hyun (born 1984), actress
 Lee Yoo-mi (born 1994), actress

Administrative districts
Jeonju is divided into two wards, Deokjin-gu (덕진구) and Wansan-gu (완산구) that, in turn, are divided into approximately 40 neighborhoods.

Transportation
Many city buses and taxis are available in Jeonju. However, tourists are often advised to walk between points of interest, as many attractions are near each other.

Attractions
 Jeonju International Film Festival usually runs from the end of April to May for one week annually.

Sports

Jeonju hosts K League team Jeonbuk Hyundai Motors FC. The team's home ground is the Jeonju World Cup Stadium. Jeonju also hosts a semi-professional football team, Jeonju Citizen FC, which plays in the K4 League. Their home ground is the Jeonju Sports Complex Stadium.
In addition, Jeonju also hosts Jeonju KCC Egis, a professional basketball team which competes in the Korean Basketball League.

Climate
Jeonju has a cooler version of a humid subtropical climate (Köppen climate classification Cwa) or humid continental (Dwa) depending on whether the -3 °C or 0 °C isotherm is used.

Jeonju, like all of Korea, has four distinct seasons (spring, summer, fall, and winter). The winters can have a mix of days that are cool to days that are quite cold. The colder days are often influenced by a high pressure front that brings cold air from Siberia.

In the summer, the humidity of Southeast Asia comes over the Korean peninsula from June through September. Temperatures in spring (late April and through May) and fall (after September 25 and through October) are often in the mid-20s℃ and with low humidity.

Sister cities 
  San Diego, California, United States
  Suzhou, Jiangsu, China
  Kanazawa, Ishikawa, Japan
  Antalya, Turkey
  Mokpo, South Jeolla, South Korea

See also
List of cities in South Korea
Joseon Dynasty

References

External links

Jeonju city government home page
Jeonju tourcity government home page

 

 
Cities in North Jeolla Province